HMS Intrepid was one of nine s built for the Royal Navy during the 1930s.

Description
The I-class ships were improved versions of the preceding H-class. They were powered by two Parsons geared steam turbines, each driving one propeller shaft, using steam provided by three Admiralty three-drum boilers. Their crew numbered 145 officers and ratings.

The ships mounted four 4.7-inch (120 mm) Mark IX guns in single mounts, designated 'A', 'B', 'X' and 'Y' from bow to stern. For anti-aircraft (AA) defence, they had two quadruple mounts for the 0.5 inch Vickers Mark III machine gun. The I class was fitted with two above-water quintuple torpedo tube mounts for  torpedoes. One depth charge rack and two throwers were fitted; 16 depth charges were originally carried, but this increased to 35 shortly after the war began. Intrepid was one of the four I-class destroyers fitted with minelaying equipment in late 1938 – January 1939 at Malta. This consisted of mounts for rails on the deck on which to carry the mines and an electric winch to move the mines down the rails. A pair of sponsons were added to the stern to allow the mines to clear the propellers when dropped into the sea. 'A' and 'Y' guns and both sets of torpedo tubes were modified to allow them to be removed to compensate for the weight of the mines. The ships could carry a maximum of 72 mines. The I-class ships were fitted with the ASDIC sound detection system to locate submarines underwater.

Construction and career

During naval manoeuvres on the 17 March 1940 Intrepid collided with the Leith-based fishing trawler MV Ocean Mist sinking the smaller ship and killing two of her crew but rescuing the other eight

Intrepid was adopted by the town of Uxbridge in 1942 to raise funds for the ship's costs.

Sinking

Intrepid was attacked by German Ju 88 aircraft and sank in Leros harbour in the Aegean Sea on 26 September 1943.

Notes

References
 
 
 
 
 
 
 
 

 
 
 
 

 

I-class destroyers of the Royal Navy
Ships built on the Isle of Wight
1936 ships
World War II destroyers of the United Kingdom
Destroyers sunk by aircraft
World War II shipwrecks in the Aegean Sea
Maritime incidents in September 1943
Ships sunk by German aircraft